Mette de Neergaard (born 6 November 1991 in Copenhagen) is a Danish curler. She is currently the alternate player on the Lene Nielsen rink which will represent Denmark at the 2014 Winter Olympics.

References

External links
 

1991 births
Danish female curlers
Living people
Curlers at the 2014 Winter Olympics
Olympic curlers of Denmark
Neergaard (noble family)
Sportspeople from Copenhagen
21st-century Danish women